Teams in the American Hockey League first hosted games outdoors in 2010. Paralleling the National Hockey League's Winter Classic and Heritage Classic, these outdoor games frequently pit two regional rivals in a game in an outdoor venue. Inasmuch as the games have carried a unified brand (most have been independently named and organized), the most commonly used name for these events has been the Outdoor Classic.

History

2009–10

The Mirabito Outdoor Classic was the first-ever outdoor hockey game in the 74-year history of the American Hockey League (AHL) as well as the first minor league outdoor game. The game was put on by the Syracuse Crunch and played at the New York State Fairgrounds in Syracuse, New York.  The game took place on February 20, 2010, with the Crunch beating the Binghamton Senators (Binghamton, NY) 2–1. The game set an AHL attendance record with 21,508 people making history.  The title sponsor of the game was Mirabito Energy Products with other prime sponsors including Time Warner Cable, Toyota, Labatt Blue, Coca-Cola, Dunkin Donuts, Wynit, Syracuse Conventions and Visitors Bureau and Renaissance Syracuse Hotel.

2010–11

The second outdoor AHL game, known as the Whale Bowl, was held between the Providence Bruins and the recently rechristened Connecticut Whale on February 19, 2011, at Rentschler Field in East Hartford. The game was held one day before the NHL's 2011 Heritage Classic and Hockey Day in America celebrations, and took place as part of USA Hockey's Hockey Weekend Across America promotions. The Whale Bowl was a highlight of a multiple-day "Whalers Hockey Fest" organized by the Whale in honor of the former Hartford Whalers; prior to the game, two other hockey games were held on the outdoor surface, including a college hockey game between Atlantic Hockey Association rivals Army Black Knights and American International College (Army won 4–1), as well as an alumni game between alumni of the Boston Bruins and Hartford Whalers (which ended in a 4–4 tie) which drew 10,000 fans. 28,600 ticket were in the market, 21,673 tickets were sold for the feature event, but only about 15,234 fans actually showed up at the stadium to see the game. The Providence Bruins defeated the Connecticut Whale in a shootout, 5–4.

2011–12
AHL teams scheduled two outdoor games for the 2011–12 season, one in the United States and another in Canada (a first for the series).

The first of the two was scheduled for January 6, 2012 at Citizens Bank Park in Philadelphia, Pennsylvania. The Adirondack Phantoms (who formerly played in Philadelphia and are the farm team to the Philadelphia Flyers), faced the Hershey Bears (themselves a former Flyers farm club). The Phantoms scored with 20.8 seconds left in regulation to send it to overtime before Shane Harper scored 58 seconds into overtime giving the Phantoms a 4–3 victory. The game was held in conjunction with the 2012 NHL Winter Classic, which was held at the same venue four days prior. The game set an AHL attendance record with 45,653 fans attending, more than double the previous record of 21,673.

Another outdoor game was held at Ivor Wynne Stadium in Hamilton, Ontario, which featured a match-up between the Toronto Marlies and the Hamilton Bulldogs, on January 21, 2012. A crowd of 20,565 spectators watched the Marlies beat the Bulldogs, 7–2. Included in the festivities were two college hockey games hosted by the Brock Badgers: a men's test against the Waterloo Warriors and a women's contest against the University of Ontario Institute of Technology Ridgebacks. The event was known as the "Steeltown Showdown" in reference to Hamilton's steel mills.

2012–13

On March 24, 2012, the AHL and the Hershey Bears announced via Twitter that the Wilkes-Barre/Scranton Penguins and the Hershey Bears were to play the 2013 Capital BlueCross AHL Outdoor Classic on January 20, 2013. The game was played at Hersheypark Stadium in Hershey, Pennsylvania. Hershey took the lead in the second period but the Penguins scored a goal in the third to send the game to overtime. Paul Thompson would score in overtime, winning the game 2–1 for the Penguins. The game was played before a crowd of 17,311 spectators.

As a result of the 2012–13 NHL lockout, a second planned outdoor game between the Grand Rapids Griffins and Toronto Marlies, to be held in Detroit's Comerica Park on December 30, 2012, as part of the NHL Winter Classic, was canceled. (The scheduled game was moved indoors to Van Andel Arena.)

2013–14

The Rochester Americans hosted the Frozen Frontier on December 13, 2013, taking on the Lake Erie Monsters at Frontier Field. The game kicked off a 10-day festival that included college hockey games hosted by the Rochester Institute of Technology men's and women's teams, high school hockey contests, and a matchup between Americans alumni and the Buffalo Sabres Alumni Hockey Team. The Americans announced their participation on March 21, 2013. Each team wore throwback uniforms for the event, with the Monsters donning a jersey worn by their predecessors, the Cleveland Barons.

One year after their game had been originally scheduled, the Grand Rapids Griffins hosted the Toronto Marlies at Comerica Park on December 30, 2013, as part of the Hockeytown Winter Festival leading up to the 2014 NHL Winter Classic. The Marlies won in a shootout, 4–3, to become the first team ever to win two AHL outdoor games.

2014–15

In lieu of an outdoor game, the stadium showcase for the 2014–15 season was the Toyota Frozen Dome Classic, which was hosted (as was the 2010 Outdoor Classic) by the Syracuse Crunch. This game was played at the Carrier Dome in Syracuse and featured the Crunch defeating the Utica Comets 2–1 in front of 30,175 fans (an indoor attendance record for professional hockey in the United States) on November 22, 2014.

2015–16

On December 18, 2015, the Stockton Heat hosted the Bakersfield Condors in an outdoor game called the Golden State Hockey Rush at Raley Field in West Sacramento, California. Stockton defeated Bakersfield 3–2 in front of 9,357 fans.

2016–17

For the second consecutive season the AHL played an outdoor game in California. The Bakersfield Condors were named as hosts for their second outdoor game against the Ontario Reign. It was held on January 7, 2017, at Bakersfield College's Memorial Stadium and was called the Condorstown Outdoor Classic. The game went on as scheduled despite the sometimes heavy rain towards the beginning of the game causing water to cover the ice. The Condors went on to defeat the Reign 3–2 in overtime.

2017–18

The 2018 Outdoor Classic was hosted by the Hershey Bears as part of their 80th anniversary season. The game was held on January 20, 2018, at Hersheypark Stadium against the Lehigh Valley Phantoms.

A second Outdoor Classic, in conjunction with the NHL 100 Classic, was also under consideration with the recently transplanted Belleville Senators potentially hosting the event at TD Place Stadium at Lansdowne Park, but did not make the schedule.

2020-21
After two seasons without an outdoor game, the Utica Comets planned to be hosting the AIS Empire State Classic between the Comets and the Syracuse Crunch on February 13, 2021. The game will be played at the Griffiss Business & Technology Park in Rome, New York. However, with the delayed start to the season due to the COVID-19 pandemic, the game was never held and has yet to be re-scheduled.

2022-23
On March 4, 2023, The Cleveland Monsters hosted an outdoor game in Cleveland, Ohio. Held in FirstEnergy Stadium against the Wilkes-Barre/Scranton Penguins

The game was scheduled at 1:00 p.m. However due to the increase in sunshine, the game was rescheduled to 6:00 p.m.  The Monsters went on to defeat the Wilkes-Barre/Scranton Penguins 2-3 in overtime.

List of AHL outdoor games

See also
 NHL Heritage Classic
 NHL Winter Classic
List of outdoor ice hockey games

References